Hermann Böhm or Boehm may refer to:
 Hermann Boehm (admiral) (1884–1972), German admiral
 Hermann Boehm (eugenicist) (1884–1962), German doctor and professor of 'Racial Hygiene' under Nazism
 Hermann Böhm (motorcyclist) (1916–1983), German motorcyclist